Mag TV Na, De Aton Este was a weekly entertainment show of ABS-CBN Zamboanga in Zamboanga Peninsula and part of the brand regional magazine or talk show Mag TV Na. The Zamboangueño version of this show usually featured important events around the city as well as the region. However, Mag TV Na, De Aton Este focused mostly on scenic spots around mainland Zamboanga City, Zamboanga del Norte, Zamboanga del Sur and the island provinces (Basilan, Sulu and Tawi-Tawi) around it. Hosted by Kathy Daculan, Mag TV was seen on Sundays before Matanglawin on ABS-CBN TV-3 Zamboanga.

Hosts

Final host
Kathy Daculan

Previous hosts
VP Elago 
Zahra Zamora 
JV Bue 
Karen Claire Grafia
Esprite Ebias†
Lulu Gerolaga
Kelly Bernardo
Jayne Rebollos "Kikay" Rañin
Marian Leonador

See also
Mag TV Na
DXLL-TV
ABS-CBN Regional Network Group

Entertainment news shows in the Philippines
ABS-CBN Regional shows
2008 Philippine television series debuts
2018 Philippine television series endings